Chef Stéphane Froidevaux is a Michelin star awarded French chef. Froidevaux opened his first restaurant called L'antidote in Alliey hotel in Provance. After he won the Michelin star, he closed L'antidote and opened his new restaurant called Le Fantin Latour in Grenoble. Froidevaux attended the Israeli version of iron chef called Krav Sakinim (Knives Battle) and won in the first and second seasons. After the show he began to appear on television shows and commercials on Israeli television.
The 18 th January 2021, his restaurant the Fantin Latour obtains one Michelin Star

References

External links
 Le fantin latour restaurant official website
 Chef Stéphane Froidevaux on youtube

Living people
French chefs
French restaurateurs
Head chefs of Michelin starred restaurants
Year of birth missing (living people)